Johnny Jackson may refer to:
Johnny Jackson (musician) (1955–2006), drummer for The Jackson 5
Johnnie Jackson (American football) (born 1967), American football player 
Johnny Jackson (born 1953), American football player, played defensive end for the Philadelphia Eagles
Johnny Jackson (Australian footballer) (1879–1939), Australian rules footballer 
Johnnie Jackson (born 1982), footballer
Johnnie O. Jackson (born 1971), bodybuilder
Johnny "J" (Johnny Lee Jackson, 1969–2008), musician
Johnny Jackson Jr. (1945–2018), American politician

See also
John Jackson (disambiguation)